Salt Fork Township is an inactive township in Saline County, in the U.S. state of Missouri.

Salt Fork Township was erected in 1873, taking its name from a creek of the same name within its borders.

References

Townships in Missouri
Townships in Saline County, Missouri